Mayotte Bollack is a French professor of philology at the University of Lille Nord de France. She was the wife and close collaborator of Jean Bollack whose research interests she shared.

Publications (selection) 
 With Heinz Wismann: Philologie und Hermeneutik im 19. Jahrhundert / Philologie et herméneutique en 19ème siècle, Bd. 2, Göttingen 1983

Bibliography 
 A. Monet (Hg.): Le jardin romain. Épicurisme et poésie à Rome. Mélanges offerts à Mayotte Bollack. Villeneuve d’Ascq: Centre de Gestion de l’Édition Scientifique, Université Charles-de-Gaulle—Lille 3, 2003.  (Rez. James Warren, The Classical Review (New Series) 55 (2005) 116-118)

External links 
 Mayotte Bollack on data.bnf.fr

French hellenists
French philologists
Women philologists
German–French translators
Scholars of ancient Roman philosophy
20th-century French philosophers
21st-century French philosophers
20th-century births
Living people
Year of birth missing (living people)